Wanyä (also called Muchi) is a Loloish language of northern Laos. It is spoken in Ipoeching village, Bun Tay District, Phongsaly Province (Shintani 2001).

Classification
Wanyä is a sister of the Sila cluster of languages that includes Sila, Khir, Cosao, Paza (Phusang), and Phana’ (Bana).

References

Sources 
 Shintani, Tadahiko, Ryuichi Kosaka, and Takashi Kato. 2001. Linguistic Survey of Phongxaly, Lao P.D.R. Tokyo: Institute for the Study of Languages and Cultures of Asia and Africa (ILCAA).

Southern Loloish languages
Languages of Laos